Some notable fantasy short story collections, in alphabetical order by title
(some of these collections may also include some science-fiction stories):

A
The Adventures of Doctor Eszterhazy by Avram Davidson
And Walk Now Gently Through the Fire by R. A. Lafferty et al.
 Apocalypses (two novellas) by R. A. Lafferty
The Avram Davidson Treasury by Avram Davidson

B
The Back Door of History by R. A. Lafferty
The Barnum Museum by Steven Millhauser
Best Ghost Stories of J. S. Lefanu by Sheridan Le Fanu
The Best of Avram Davidson by Avram Davidson
The Best Tales of Hoffmann by E. T. A. Hoffmann
The Bible Repairman by Tim Powers
The Bloody Chamber by Angela Carter
The Book of Fritz Leiber by Fritz Leiber
The Book of Wonder by Lord Dunsany

C
Carnacki the Ghost-Finder by William Hope Hodgson
The Castle of Crossed Destinies (two novellas) by Italo Calvino
Changing Planes by Ursula K. Le Guin
Collected Fantasies by Avram Davidson
Collected Fictions by Jorge Luis Borges
 an omnibus of all eight volumes of Borges' fiction (which is entirely short stories)
The Compass Rose by Ursula K. Le Guin
The Compleat Traveller in Black  The Compleat Traveller in Black by John Brunner
Complete Fairy Tales by George MacDonald
Complete Fairy Tales by Oscar Wilde
The Compleat Traveller in Black a.k.a. The Compleat Traveller in Black by John Brunner
Cinderella

D
Dark Carnival a.k.a. The Small Assassin by Ray Bradbury
The Darrell Schweitzer Megapack by Darrell Schweitzer
The Day It Rained Forever a.k.a. A Medicine for Melancholy by Ray Bradbury
The Devils in the Details by James Blaylock and Tim Powers
Does Anyone Else Have Something Further to Add? by R. A. Lafferty
A Dreamer's Tales by Lord Dunsany
Dreams of Distant Shores by Patricia A. McKillip
Driving Blind by Ray Bradbury
The Dying Earth a.k.a. Mazirian the Magician by Jack Vance

E
The Early Lafferty by R. A. Lafferty
The Early Lafferty II by R. A. Lafferty
Echoes of the Goddess by Darrell Schweitzer
Eight Fantasms and Magics by Jack Vance
Elementals by A. S. Byatt
The Emperor of the Ancient Word and Other Fantastic Stories by Darrell Schweitzer
The Enquiries of Doctor Eszterhazy by Avram Davidson

F
Fancies and Goodnights by John Collier
Fantasy Pieces in Callot's Manner by E. T. A. Hoffmann
Femmes fantastiques by Paul Laurendeau
Fifty-One Tales a.k.a. The Food of Death by Lord Dunsany
Fireworks by Angela Carter
The Food of Death a.k.a. Fifty-One Tales by Lord Dunsany
The Fortunes of Brak by John Jakes
Four Stories by R. A. Lafferty
Fragile Things by Neil Gaiman
From the Realm of Morpheus by Steven Millhauser

G
Ghost Trouble by Richard Parks
The Ghosts of Manacle by Charles G. Finney
The Ghosts of the Heaviside Layer, and Other Fantasms by Lord Dunsany
Giant Bones a.k.a. The Magician of Karakosk by Peter S. Beagle
The Gods of Pegana by Lord Dunsany
The Golden Apples of the Sun by Ray Bradbury
Golden Gate and Other Stories by R. A. Lafferty
The Golden Pot and Other Tales by E. T. A. Hoffmann
Golden Wings and Other Stories by William Morris
The Great World and the Small: More Tales of the Ominous and Magical by Darrell Schweitzer
Green Magic by Jack Vance

H
The Harold Shea Tales by L. Sprague de Camp and Fletcher Pratt
 collected in The Incomplete Enchanter, Wall of Serpents, The Compleat Enchanter, The Complete Compleat Enchanter, The Enchanter Reborn, The Exotic Enchanter, and The Mathematics of Magic: The Enchanter Stories of L. Sprague de Camp and Fletcher Pratt
Harrowing the Dragon by Patricia A. McKillip
Heart of Stone, Dear and Other Stories by R. A. Lafferty
Heroes and Horrors by Fritz Leiber
Heroes in the Wind by Robert E. Howard

I
I Sing the Body Electric by Ray Bradbury
The Illustrated Man by Ray Bradbury
In a Glass Darkly by Sheridan Le Fanu
In For a Penny by James Blaylock
In the Penny Arcade by Steven Millhauser
Invisible Cities by Italo Calvino
Irish Fairy Tales by James Stephens
Iron Tears by R. A. Lafferty

J
John the Balladeer by Manly Wade Wellman
The Jorkens Tales by Lord Dunsany (many but not all are fantasies)
 collected in The Travel Tales of Mr. Joseph Jorkens, Jorkens Remembers Africa, Jorkens Has a Large Whiskey, The Fourth Book of Jorkens, Jorkens Borrows Another Whiskey, and The Last Book of Jorkens

K
Kai Lung Beneath the Mulberry Tree by Ernest Bramah
Kai Lung: Six by Ernest Bramah
The King in the Tree (three novellas) by Steven Millhauser
The Knight and Knave of Swords by Fritz Leiber
The Knife Thrower and Other Stories by Steven Millhauser

L
The Ladies of Grace Adieu and Other Stories by Susanna Clarke
Lafferty in Orbit by R. A. Lafferty
The Last Book of Wonder a.k.a. Tales of Wonder by Lord Dunsany
¡Limekiller! by Avram Davidson
Lin Carter's Simrana Cycle by Lin Carter
The Line Between by Peter S. Beagle
Little Black Book of Stories by A. S. Byatt
Little Kingdoms (three novellas) by Steven Millhauser
Little Wizard Stories of Oz by L. Frank Baum
Living With the Dead (The Tale of Old Corpsenberg) by Darrell Schweitzer
Long After Midnight by Ray Bradbury

M
The Machineries of Joy by Ray Bradbury
Madame Crowl's Ghost and Other Tales of Mystery by Sheridan Le Fanu
The Magician of Karakosk a.k.a. Giant Bones by Peter S. Beagle
The Man Who Ate the Phoenix by Lord Dunsany
The Man Who Made Models and Other Stories by R. A. Lafferty
The Martian Chronicles by Ray Bradbury
Mazirian the Magician a.k.a. The Dying Earth by Jack Vance
The Meaning of Life and Other Awesome Cosmic Revelations by Darrell Schweitzer
A Medicine for Melancholy a.k.a. The Day It Rained Forever by Ray Bradbury
Mischief Malicious (And Murder Most Strange) by R. A. Lafferty
Murder By Magic edited by Rosemary Edghill

N
Necromancies and Netherworlds: Uncanny Stories by Darrell Schweitzer and Jason Van Hollander
Night Moves and Other Stories by Tim Powers
Nightscapes: Tales of the Ominous and Magical by Darrell Schweitzer
Nine Hundred Grandmothers by R. A. Lafferty
Novelties & Souvenirs by John Crowley
Numbers in the Dark by Italo Calvino

O
The October Country by Ray Bradbury
The Ogre's Wife by Richard Parks
On the Banks of the River of Heaven by Richard Parks
One More for the Road by Ray Bradbury
Or All the Seas with Oysters by Avram Davidson
The Other Nineteenth Century by Avram Davidson

P
The Panic Hand by Jonathan Carroll
Poems and Stories by J. R. R. Tolkien
Poems in Prose by Oscar Wilde
Promontory Goats by R. A. Lafferty
The Purple Pterodactyls by L. Sprague de Camp

Q
Quicker Than the Eye by Ray Bradbury
Qfwfq short-story series by Italo Calvino
 collected in Cosmicomics and t zero (but Numbers in the Dark also contains some Qfwfq stories)

R
R is for Rocket by Ray Bradbury
The Redward Edward Papers by Avram Davidson
Refugees from an Imaginary Country by Darrell Schweitzer
The Reluctant Shaman and Other Fantastic Tales by L. Sprague de Camp
The Rhinoceros Who Quoted Nietzsche by Peter S. Beagle
Ringing Changes by R. A. Lafferty

S
The Serpent Bride by K.V. Johansen
S is for Space by Ray Bradbury
The Second Book of Fritz Leiber by Fritz Leiber
Sekenre: The Book of the Sorcerer by Darrell Schweitzer
Shadows & Light: Tales of Lost Kingdoms Edited by Alva J. Roberts
Slightly Off Center by Neal Barrett
Slippery and Other Stories by R. A. Lafferty
The Small Assassin a.k.a. Dark Carnival by Ray Bradbury
Smoke and Mirrors by Neil Gaiman
Snake in His Bosom and Other Stories by R. A. Lafferty
Stories of Your Life and Others by Ted Chiang
Strange Doings by R. A. Lafferty
Strange Itineraries by Tim Powers
Strange Seas and Shores by Avram Davidson
Sugar and Other Stories by A. S. Byatt
The Sword of Welleran and Other Stories by Lord Dunsany
Swords Against Death by Fritz Leiber
Swords Against Wizardry by Fritz Leiber
Swords and Deviltry by Fritz Leiber
Swords and Ice Magic by Fritz Leiber
Swords in the Mist by Fritz Leiber

T
Tales from Earthsea by Ursula K. Le Guin
Tales from Gavagan's Bar by L. Sprague de Camp and Fletcher Pratt
Tales from the Perilous Realm by J. R. R. Tolkien
Tales of E. T. A. Hoffmann by E. T. A. Hoffmann
Tales of God and Men cycle by Lord Dunsany
comprises The Gods of Pegana, Time and the Gods, The Sword of Welleran, A Dreamer's Tales, The Book of Wonder, Fifty-One Tales (a.k.a. The Food of Death), The Last Book of Wonder, and Tales of Three Hemispheres
Tales of Hoffmann by E. T. A. Hoffmann
The Tales of the Genii by James Ridley
Tales of Three Hemispheres by Lord Dunsany
Tales of Wonder a.k.a. The Last Book of Wonder by Lord Dunsany
Thirteen Phantasms by James Blaylock
Through Elegant Eyes: Stories of Austro and the Men Who Know Everything by R. A. Lafferty
Time and the Gods by Lord Dunsany
Tom O'Bedlam's Night Out and Other Strange Excursions by Darrell Schweitzer
The Toynbee Convector by Ray Bradbury
Transients and Other Disquieting Stories by Darrell Schweitzer
The Tritonian Ring and Other Pusadian Tales by L. Sprague de Camp

U
Unfinished Tales by J. R. R. Tolkien

V
Viriconium Nights by M. John Harrison

W
The Wallet of Kai Lung by Ernest Bramah
The Watcher and Other Stories by Italo Calvino
We Are All Legends by Darrell Schweitzer
What Strange Stars and Skies by Avram Davidson
Whimsical Tales of Douglas Jerrold by Douglas Jerrold
Wonders of the Invisible World by Patricia A. McKillip
Worshipping Small Gods by Richard Parks

X

Y
Yamada Monogatari: Demon Hunter by Richard Parks
Young Thongor by Lin Carter

Z

Novels and science-fiction short-story collections should not be included here: they have their own lists.

Story collections
 
Lists of stories